Feldkirch is a medieval town in the western Austrian state of Vorarlberg, bordering on Switzerland and Liechtenstein. It is the administrative centre of the Feldkirch district. After Dornbirn, it is the second most populous town in Vorarlberg. The westernmost point in Austria lies in Feldkirch on the river Rhine, at the tripoint between Austria, Switzerland, and Liechtenstein.

History
This beautiful medieval town, which remains well preserved to this day, was mentioned as a city for the first time in 1218, after Count Hugo von Montfort built the "Schattenburg", a castle which still is the major landmark of Feldkirch. Other sights in the town include the Gothic-style cathedral of St. Nikolaus. Feldkirch was the birthplace of Rheticus, and is currently the seat of the Roman Catholic Diocese of Feldkirch. From 1651 to 1773 and from 1856 to 1979, Feldkirch was the home of the Jesuit school Stella Matutina.

March 1799 saw two clashes between the forces of the First French Republic and the Habsburg monarchy. On the 7th, Nicolas Oudinot, with 9,000 French soldiers, defeated Friedrich Freiherr von Hotze and his 6,000 Austrians. The Battle of Feldkirch occurred on 23 March, when André Masséna and 12,000 Frenchmen were beaten by Franjo Jelačić and a force of 5,500 Austrians.

Town subdivisions 
 Feldkirch
 Altenstadt 
 Gisingen
 Levis 
 Nofels 
 Tisis 
 Tosters

Population

Economy and infrastructure

Transport 
Feldkirch has had its own local bus network since 1993. It currently consists of eight lines, including buses which run to the north of neighbouring Liechtenstein. The bus system cooperates with Vorarlberg's regional bus system. The Feldkirch railway station lies on the main railway line through the Vorarlberg, with inter-city services to Zurich and Vienna. There are also local international trains to Buchs via Liechtenstein on the Feldkirch–Buchs railway.

Companies 
The following companies and service organizations are based in Feldkirch:
 Bachmann Electronic
 Vorarlberg Milch
 Lingenhöle Technologie
 Stadtwerke Feldkirch
 KSW Tankstellen- und Industrieanlagenbau
 Gebäudereinigung Bauer
 Landeskrankenhaus Feldkirch

Culture and landmarks

Central Feldkirch 
Feldkirch has one of the best preserved medieval townscapes of Vorarlberg. The town was built around 1200 and has a geometric grid system. Since around 1500, when the city wall was rebuilt, the city has remained unchanged over the centuries.

Since 2015, the Feldkirch Municipal Ensemble has been listed in the Austrian List of Cultural Heritage (cultural property protected by the Hague Convention). The city is also a member of the Association of Small Historic Towns, a tourism marketing association.

In 2015, the Montforthaus Feldkirch was newly renovated. It is a public venue for cultural activities like balls, trade fairs, concerts and theatre performances.

City fortification 
The streets of the Schlossgraben, Hirschgraben and St. Leonhardsplatz marked the former course of the city wall surrounding the Neustadt area in the 13th century. The wall was largely rebuilt around 1500, and torn down in many places beginning in 1826.

When Feldkirch was surrounded by a city wall and a city moat, one could enter the city only through one of its four gates. These city gates were called Bregenzertor or Nikolaustor, Bludenzertor or Schultor, Milltor or Sautor, and Churertor or Salztor. The last two gates are still standing, the other two were removed together with the city wall at the beginning of the 19th century.

The Katzenturm (cat tower) or colloquially Dicker Turm (fat tower) is a defense tower built in 1507 as part of the city wall's Hirschgraben. The 8-storey round and 40 m high tower was built as part of the city fortifications under the reign of Emperor Maximilian I from 1491-1507. In the 17th century, the bell room for the Katzenturmglocke (cat tower bell) named "Maria Rochus" was built. The bell is the biggest in Vorarlberg(as of 2022) and weighs 8,5 t. The tower has an image of the Virgin Mary restored by Florus Scheel in the 19th century. The origin of the name Katzenturm has not been fully clarified to this day. One theory is that it got its name from the heavy artillery that the fortified tower was equipped with at the time. These were decorated with a lion's head, popularly referred to as a "cat".

Castles and palaces 
 Schattenburg: The Schattenburg castle was the seat of the counts of Montfort until 1390. The first construction phase began around 1230 under Hugo I of Montfort, the founder of the city. Under Count Friedrich von Toggenburg (1416–1436) and under the Vogt Hans of Königsegg extensions and transformations of the Schattenburg castle were built in the 15th century. After the counts lost their power, the castle was repeatedly put up for auction, and was even to be demolished in 1813. Since 1825 the castle has been owned by the town of Feldkirch, which at that time acquired it for 833 florins. The castle then served as barracks, and later as accommodation for the poor. The castle owes its rescue and revitalization to the Museum and Homeland Security Association for Feldkirch and the Surrounding Area which was founded in 1912. The upper floors are home to a museum of local history that attracts about 25,000 visitors annually.
 Ruins of Tosters: The ruins of a hill castle on a hillside part of the Schellenberg, in the Feldkirch district of Tosters.
 Palais Liechtenstein: In today's form, the house was built in the Schlossergasse No. 8 after the town fire of 1697, as an office building for the prince Johann Adam Andreas of Liechtenstein in Baroque style. In 1848 it became the property of Andreas Ritter of Tschavoll, at that time Feldkirch mayor and manufacturer. The town acquired the palais in 1967 and today the building is used as an exhibition centre. It is home of the cultural council, and also the seat of the city library and the city archives.

Villas and other residential buildings 
In the 19th century the Feldkirch bourgeoisie built a number of prestigious residential buildings, most of which are still privately owned. The villas were built mostly on the Reichsstraße, mainly in the area between the Bärenkreuzung and the train station.

Cultural events 

The Montforter Zwischentöne is an interdisciplinary festival that takes place three times a year. Each series is based on a specific topic which is artistically and dramaturgically interpreted without genre-orientated boundaries. There are contributions from the fields of music, poetry, architecture, science, dance etc. The festival addresses issues of social and personal development on site and provides impetus for urban and regional development.

The Poolbar Festival is a modern music and cultural festival in Feldkirch. Held annually in July and August, it attracts around 20,000 visitors; it features music, exhibitions, poetry slams, fashion and an architectural prize. It was first held in 1994 as a cultural summer-academy and is, in its organization and implementation of landscape and architecture, very different from other open-air events.

The bi-annual light art festival Lichtstadt Feldkirch lets international artists fill the city of Feldkirch with light objects, projections and sculptures. Its first edition was held in 2018 and attracted 30.000 visitors.

The POTENTIALe (formerly 'ArtDesign Feldkirch') is an art fair and festival at which about 110 exhibitors present their products and ideas. In addition to a vintage market, there are workshops and discussion groups, a design laboratory, photography exhibitions, and music and films are presented. The aim of the festival is to establish a network of artists, craftsmen and customers that share the common vision of sustainable design.

The Feldkirch Festival (2001-2012) was an annual summer festival that offered theater performances, concerts and other cultural events.

The Wochenmarkt Feldkirch is a market in the Marktgasse in the city centre. At the market, fresh local produce and specialities like Bregenz Forest cheese are offered. It is open two days a week.

James Joyce and Feldkirch 
The Irish writer James Joyce is inextricably linked to Feldkirch. In World War II, Joyce was mistaken for a spy at the border check in Feldkirch in 1915 and almost arrested. Thanks to influential friends, he was regarded as a "friendly foreigner". The Irishman saw this event at the Feldkirch train station as fateful. Subsequently, it influenced his most important work. In the summer of 1932, the friendship with the publisher couple Maria and Eugene Jolas brought the writer back to Feldkirch, where he stayed for several weeks at the Hotel Löwen and worked on Finnegans Wake (published 1939). During this stay, Joyce himself said that Ulysses (1922) was inextricably linked to Feldkirch: "Over there, on those tracks, the fate of 'Ulysses' was decided in 1915."

Climate 
Feldkirch has a oceanic climate (Cfb).

Schools 
 Bundesgymnasium und Bundesrealgymnasium Feldkirch (founded in 1649)
 Bundeshandelsakademie und Bundeshandelsschule Feldkirch
 Bundesoberstufenrealgymnasium und Bundesrealgymnasium Schillerstrasse (GYS)& Musikgymnasium Feldkirch www.gys.at
 Bundeshandelsakademie und Handelsschule Feldkirch
 Institut St. Josef
 Musikschule der Stadt Feldkirch
 Stella Matutina (Jesuit school) (former)
 Pädagogische Hochschule des Bundes in Vorarlberg
 Vorarlberger Landeskonservatorium

Notable people 

 Bartholomäus Bernhardi (1487–1551), Lutheran theologian
 Wolf Huber (ca.1485–1553), painter of the Danube school and architect
 Georg Joachim Rheticus (1514–1574), mathematician and astronomer.
 Barbara Erni (1743–1785) thief and confidence trickster, last person to be executed by Liechtenstein.
 Alois Handl (1837–1915), an Austrian physicist.
 Karl Bleyle (1880–1969), musician and composer
 Elmar Fischer (1936-2022), bishop of the Feldkirch diocese
 Bernhard Leitner (born 1938), artist
 P. Georg Sporschill SJ (born 1946), pastor known for his social engagement for orphans and street children in Romania and Moldova and work with the homeless in Vienna.
 Günther Freitag (born 1952), novelist
 Herbert Bösch (born 1954), politician and MEP
 Christine Wohlwend (born 1978), Liechtensteiner politician
 Hans Weingartner (born 1970), author, director and film producer

Sport 
 Wiltrud Drexel (born 1950), ski racer, bronze medallist in the giant slalom at the 1972 Winter Olympics
 Marcel Büchel (born 1991) a footballer with over 300 club caps and 17 for Liechtenstein
 Katharina Liensberger (born 1997), alpine ski racer, team gold medallist at the 2022 Winter Olympics
 Marco Rossi (born 2001) NHL player for the Minnesota Wild

Sport clubs 
VEU Feldkirch
TC-ESV Feldkirch
Tennisclub Swietelsky Blau-Weiss Feldkirch
TSV Altenstadt
SC Tisis
FC Blau-Weiß Feldkirch
Baseball- and Softballclub Feldkirch Cardinals
Metafund Baskets Feldkirch (Basketball)
HC Blau-Weiß Feldkirch
Sportbillardclub Feldkirch
Schiverein Tisis
Volleyballclub SSK Feldkirch

Twin towns
 Whitby, Ontario, Canada
 Sigmaringen, Baden-Württemberg, Germany

See also
 Feldkirch Sickhouse

References

External links 

 
 

 
Cities and towns in Feldkirch District
Austria–Liechtenstein border crossings
Austria–Switzerland border crossings
Liechtenstein–Switzerland border crossings
Border tripoints
Bregenz Forest Mountains